Gledajući u mrak (Looking Into The Darkness) is the debut album by the Serbian rock band Džukele, released by Metropolis Records in 1994.

Track listing 
Lyrics by Slobodan Vukosavljević, music by Džukele, except for track 4, written by Sting.

Personnel 
 Leo fon Punkerstein (artwork by [design])
 Dragan Neorčić "Draža" (bass)
 Rudolf Aleksić "Rudi" (drums)
 Nenad Drašković (executive producer)
 Leonid Pilipović "Leo" (guitar, vocals)
 Slobodan Vukosavljević "Bane" (lyrics by, vocals, guitar)
 Željko Vukelić (photography [front])
 Silvija Aleksić (photography [inside])
 Aleksandar Stamenković (recorded by)
 Predrag Pejić (recorded by)

References 

 EX YU ROCK enciklopedija 1960-2006, Janjatović Petar; 
 Gledajući u mrak at Discogs
 Gledajući u mrak at Rateyourmusic

Džukele albums
1994 debut albums